The discography of Joanna Newsom, an American alternative folk musician, consists of four studio albums, three extended plays four singles, and three promotional singles.

Studio albums

Extended plays

Singles

Promotional singles

Music videos

Contributions on compilations
 The Golden Apples of the Sun (Bastet, 2004) With the song "Bridges and Balloons" (Originally released on The Milk-Eyed Mender)

Bands, collaborations and guest appearances
 Golden Shoulders – Let My Burden Be (Doppler, 2002)
 The Pleased – One Piece from the Middle (self-released, 2002)
 The Pleased – Don't Make Things (Big Wheel Recreation, 2003)
 Nervous Cop – Nervous Cop (5 Rue Christine, 2003)
 Vetiver – Vetiver (Dicristina Stair, 2004)
 Smog – A River Ain't Too Much to Love (Drag City, 2005)
 Vashti Bunyan – Lookaftering (Fat Cat Records, 2005)
 RF & Lili De La Mora – Eleven Continents (Rowing at Sea/ Time Release Records, 2007)
 Moore Brothers – Aptos (American Dust, 2009)
 Golden Shoulders – Get Reasonable (2009)
 Kevin Barker – You and Me (Gnomonsong, 2010)
 The Roots – How I Got Over (2010)
 Thao with the Get Down Stay Down – We the Common (Ribbon Music, 2013)
 Hard Skin – The Man Who Ran the Town (JT Classics, 2013)

References

Discographies of American artists
Rock music discographies